Jess Brittain is a British television writer. She is best known as a writer for the Channel 4 TV series Skins, and as the creator, producer and writer for the web television thriller series Clique, streamed on BBC Three.

Biography 
After her teenage years in Bristol, Brittain studied English literature at the University of Edinburgh. Her first professional experience was writing scripts for the Channel 4 television series Skins, for which she had initially given some informal contributions as a teenager. She also wrote the spin off novel Skins: Summer Holiday.

Subsequently, she created and wrote for the BBC Three thriller Clique.

Brittain is the daughter of Scottish TV writer and Skins co-creator Bryan Elsley.

Filmography 
 Skins (2007-2013)  - writer (2011-2013)
 Clique (2016-2018) - creator, writer, associate producer (series 1), executive producer (series 2).
 Eden (2021) - co-writer (episode 2) 
 The Essex Serpent (2022) - writer (episode 3)

Bibliography 
 Skins: Summer Holiday (2011) London: Hodder Children's.

References

External links 
 

British women screenwriters
Year of birth missing (living people)
Living people
Alumni of the University of Edinburgh